Odette Delcellier, (married name Ducas, born 4 November 1940 in Chevrainvilliers) is a former French athlete in track and field. 1.73m in  height and weighing 63 kg, she was a specialist in the long jump and also competed at the Summer Olympic Games in the pentathlon.

Career 
She competed for  Lille until 1973; in addition to the long jump, in modern pentathlon and sprinting.

She represented France in the 1972 Olympics, in the long jump (20th place) and the pentathlon (23rd place).

Achievements  
  27 International French Team caps for France Athletics, from 1957 to 1973
  Record holder in France in 1968,  1970, and 1971 with a jump of 6.49 m.
  France record holder in the pentathlon in 1968 and 1971
  European Indoor Relay Champion 4 × 1 relay in 1969
   France champion in long jump 1962 and from 1968 to 1973
  silver medal in the 4 × 100 m relay at the Mediterranean Games in 1971
 4th place in the 80 m hurdles at the Mediterranean Games in 1971

References

Sources
 
 

1940 births
Living people
French female long jumpers
French pentathletes
Olympic athletes of France
Athletes (track and field) at the 1972 Summer Olympics
Mediterranean Games silver medalists for France
Mediterranean Games medalists in athletics
Athletes (track and field) at the 1971 Mediterranean Games